Old Town is a small neighbourhood in the London Borough of Croydon, adjacent to the modern town centre, and bisected by a major road.

The road is a dual-carriageway and forms part of the A236 which is a major A Road connecting both Mitcham and South Croydon. The road, heading from Mitcham, joins the A236 from Roman Way next to Reeves Corner tram stop and carries on the three lane dual-carriageway past Old Palace School and Central Croydon Fire station. After this is a roundabout which is a junction with the Croydon Flyover on the A232 road, then Old Town carries on for only a couple of metres where another smaller roundabout stands. This is a junction onto Lower Coombe Street (A212) or Southbridge Road (A236).

The Old Town area itself has a large residential and business community, and is in the CR0 postcode area. There are two secondary schools in the area, Old Palace School (also a church) and the site of the former St Andrew's Church of England High School, currently being used by The Write Time School. Old Town is home to Croydon town centre's main fire station, Croydon Minster and Surrey Street Market. In 2017 the area was the site of council-funded tech incubator scheme, with several companies relocating from central London.

Nearest stations
Reeves Corner tram stop
Church Street tram stop
Wandle Park tram stop
West Croydon station
Waddon railway station

References

External links
LondonTown

Districts of the London Borough of Croydon